Garnarich is a village in the Amasia Municipality of the Shirak Province of Armenia.

The community of Garnarich consists of the villages of Garnarich and Eghnajur. The Statistical Committee of Armenia reported the community's population was 273 in 2010, down from 288 at the 2001 census. The village's population was 260 at the 2001 census.

Demographics
The population of the village since 1886 is as follows:

References 

Communities in Shirak Province
Populated places in Shirak Province